Isoma (Greek: Ίσωμα) may refer to several places in Greece:

Isoma, Achaea, a town in Achaea 
Isoma, Kilkis, a town in the municipal unit Kroussa
Isoma Karyon, a town in Arcadia

See also

Isomata (disambiguation)